The POMIS Cup (known fully as President of Maldives Invitational Soccer Cup) is an international club football tournament kicked off in 1987 to promote the standards of local football in Maldives. This is the only international soccer club tournament held in the Maldives.

Due to various reasons, Football Association of Maldives (FAM) was not able to stage the tournament in the years of 2002 and 2004 to 2014.

In 2003, two foreign clubs from India and Sri Lanka competed in the cup, Mahindra United and Negombo Youth.

On 22 December 2014, Football Association of Maldives (FAM) normalisation committee decided to introduce POMIS Cup again and started in January 2015.  In 2015, the top two teams of Dhivehi League played against two foreign teams in the POMIS Cup.

From 2016 onward, there will be four Maldivian teams (top four teams of Dhivehi Premier League) to participate the tournament along with two foreign teams. On 19 January 2015, POMIS Cup committee rebranded the President of Maldives Invitational Soccer Cup to the People of Maldives Invitational Soccer Cup.

Previous winners
1987 : Renown Sports Club 0-0 Saunders SC [3-1 pen] 
1988 : York SC (Sri Lanka) 5-4 New Radiant SC
1989 : Victory Sports Club 4-3 Club Valencia 
1990 : Indian Youth Team  4-1 Victory Sports Club
1991 : York FC (Sri Lanka) 0-0 Dempo SC [5-4 pen] 
1992 : Club Valencia 2-1 Dempo SC 
1993 : Kerala SC (India) 2-1 Victory Sports Club
1994 : New Radiant SC 1-1 Colombo FC [7-5 pen] 
1995 : New Radiant SC 1-1 Victory Sports Club [4-2 pen]
1996 : Club Valencia 3-2 Victory Sports Club 
1997 : New Radiant SC 3-2 Victory Sports Club
1998 : Thailand U-19s 2-1 New Radiant SC
1999 : Hurriyya SC 1-0 Victory Sports Club
2000 : Hurriyya SC 1-1 Club Valencia [4-3 pen] 
2001 : Club Valencia 1-0 Victory Sports Club
2002    not held
2003 : Mahindra United 3-1 Club Valencia
2004 to 2014  not held
2015 : PDRM FA 5-4 Maziya S&RC
2016 to 2018  not held

Peoples Cup (2015) teams
Maziya S&RC
New Radiant SC
 PDRM FA
 Singapore LionsXII

Number of titles
New Radiant SC (3)

Club Valencia (3)
York FC (Sri Lanka) (2)
Hurriyya SC (2)
Renown Sports Club (1)
Victory Sports Club (1)
Indian Youth Team (1)
Kerala SC (India) (1)
Thailand U-19s (1)
Mahindra United (1)
PDRM FA (1)

References

External links
POMIS Cup history at RSSSF

 
International association football competitions hosted by the Maldives
Football cup competitions in the Maldives